is a Japanese YouTuber and former singer. In 2000, while he was in middle school, he joined the group EE Jump as their lead rapper under the stage name . He is the younger brother of singer and former Morning Musume member Maki Goto.

Throughout the 2000s, Goto was involved in several scandals, two of which led to EE Jump's disbandment. In 2007, he was arrested for theft and was sentenced to five and half years in prison.

In the late 2010s, Goto began appearing in several talk shows and joined YouTube in 2021. He later signed with Excelling in 2022.

Career

2000-2002: EE Jump

In 1999, when he was in 6th grade, Goto was scouted by Harmony Promotion while he was at one of Maki Goto's events. He was assigned to a group with Sonim and Ken under the name EE Jump as their lead rapper. Together, they made their first televised appearance on the variety show Warau Inu no Bōken. Though Ken left the group before their CD debut, EE Jump released their first single on October 18, 2000 with the song "Love is Energy!" and achieved mainstream success with their summer hit  on May 16, 2001.

Despite EE Jump's success, Goto disliked performing in the group and was constantly told by staff that he lacked skill in singing and keeping in rhythm. During promotions for EE Jump's fourth single, Goto had an argument with the group's female manager over their tight schedules, which led him to physically assault her and check out of his hotel room without permission, fleeing to Tochigi Prefecture. The chief manager of Harmony Promotion, Kaoru Wada, suspended his activities for three months while Sonim continued promoting without him. After issuing an apology, Goto rejoined EE Jump in February 2002; however, shortly after graduating middle school, tabloid magazine Friday published photographs of him drinking alcohol while underage at a cabaret club in a VIP room with a member of Johnny's Jr. After consulting with his agency, Goto decided to leave the entertainment industry, which led to EE Jump disbanding on April 13, 2002.

2013-present: Sange and comeback

After serving five years in prison, in 2013, Goto released a memoir titled Sange: Gomaki no Otōto to Yobarete ( Repentance: They Call Me Gomaki's Little Brother), which discussed his parents' deaths, his relationship with his sister Maki, and his struggles with fame.

In 2016, Goto appeared as a hair model, representing the salon Gossip Hair. In 2017, Goto appeared as a guest on the web talk show Imada-Higashi no Curricular, making his first televised appearance in 15 years. In 2018, he appeared again on the show's second season.

On July 7, 2021, Goto started a YouTube channel titled Otto Totto Channel. On January 26, 2022, he announced through his Instagram account that he had signed with the talent agency Excelling.

Personal life 

Goto dropped out of high school in the middle of his first year. Goto has several tattoos, receiving his first one, a carp on his neck, when he was 20 years old.

Family
Goto's older sister is singer Maki Goto, a former member of Morning Musume. In 1996, while Goto was on a hiking trip in the mountains with his father and a family friend, his father died from a fall. Goto himself had noticed it first, as he had stated, "Hey, didn't you hear a loud thump just now?"

On January 23, 2010, Goto's mother, Tokiko Goto, fell from the third story of their house in Edogawa, Tokyo at 11 PM. She was rushed to the hospital, but died from her injuries on January 24 at 1:13 AM. Goto was incarcerated at the time from his 2007 arrest and was not allowed to attend her funeral.

In 2005, Goto married a non-celebrity woman at the age of 18, who he had later divorced. In 2015, Goto married Chizuru, who he had met in 2013; Chizuru later won the Ameba Award in April 2022 after opening her blog in the same month. Altogether, Goto has three daughters. His eldest daughter is Ukka member Moa Serizawa.

Arrest
His accomplices included two of his friends, who were 18 and 19 years old respectively. He was identified by the police by his tattoos. He was sentenced to five and a half years in jail by the Tokyo District Court in May 2008.

Discography

Publications
  (2013)

References

1986 births
Singers from Tokyo
Japanese dance music singers
Japanese YouTubers
Japanese synth-pop singers
Living people
21st-century Japanese singers